Leon Ellis may refer to:
 Leon F. "Lee" Ellis, United States Air Force colonel, author, speaker, and consultant
 Leon MacIntosh Ellis, New Zealand forestry administrator and consultant